John Clopton (died 1424), of Gloucester, was an English politician.

He was a Member (MP) of the Parliament of England for Gloucester in May 1413.

References

Year of birth missing
1424 deaths
15th-century English people
People from Gloucester
Members of the Parliament of England (pre-1707) for Gloucester